Stanislaw Pilecki  (4 February 1947 – 20 December 2017) was an Australian rugby union player with Polish roots. He was born in a refugee camp in Augustdorf, Germany, with his family emigrating to Australia in 1950. He was also an Old Boy of Marist College Rosalie in Brisbane.

Pilecki was the first player to play 100 matches for Queensland Reds, playing 122 matches in total. Pilecki also played 18 tests, and was the first player of Polish descent to play for Australia.

The Pilecki Medal is an award given to the Queensland Reds player of the year each season.

References
Stan Pilecki at Reds Rugby
AFP interview with Stan Pilecki published on rugby365.com

1947 births
2017 deaths
Australian people of Polish descent
Australian rugby union players
Australia international rugby union players
Rugby union props
Recipients of the Medal of the Order of Australia